Tessiera is a genus of flowering plants belonging to the family Rubiaceae.

It is native to Mexico.

The genus name of Tessiera is in honour of Henri-Alexandre Tessier (1741–1837), a French doctor and agronomist. 
It was first described and published in Prodr. Vol.4 on page 574 in 1830.

Known species
According to Kew:
 Tessiera hexasepala 
 Tessiera lithospermoides

References

Rubiaceae
Rubiaceae genera
Plants described in 1830
Flora of Mexico